The 2016 Paris Motor Show took place from 1 October to 16 October.

Introductions

Production cars

 Abarth 595 (refresh)
 Alfa Romeo Giulia Veloce
 Audi Q3 (refresh)
 Audi Q5
 Audi RS3 Sedan
 Audi A5 Sportback
 Audi A5 Coupe
 BMW 3 Series GT (refresh)
 Citroën C3
 Dacia Logan (refresh)
 Dacia Sandero (refresh)
 Ferrari LaFerrari Aperta
 Ferrari GTC4Lusso T
 Honda Civic
 Hyundai i30
 Hyundai i20 (refresh) renamed Hyundai New Generation i20
 Jeep Grand Cherokee (refresh)
 Kia Rio
 Kia Soul (refresh)
 Kia Carens (refresh)
 Land Rover Discovery
 Maserati Quattroporte (facelift)
 Mercedes-AMG GT Roadster
 Mercedes-Benz E-Class Estate All-Terrain
 Mercedes-Benz E-Class Estate
 MINI Clubman JCW
 Nissan Micra
 Opel Karl Rocks
 Opel Ampera-e (all-electric car)
 Opel Zafira Tourer (refresh)
 Peugeot 3008
 Peugeot 5008
 Porsche Panamera
 Renault Clio (refresh)
 Renault Twingo GT
 Renault Grand Scenic
 Renault Koleos (European Debut)
 Seat Mii (refresh)
 Skoda Kodiaq
 Smart Fortwo electric drive Cabriolet (convertible) (all-electric car) 
 Suzuki SX4 S-Cross (refresh)
 Suzuki Ignis (European Debut)
 Toyota GT86 (refresh)

Concept cars

 BMW X2
 Citroën CXperience
 Honda Civic Type-R
 Hyundai N Concept RN30
 Lexus LF-UX
 Mercedes-Benz Generation EQ (all-electric car) SUV
 Mercedes-Maybach Vision 6 (all-electric car)
 Mitsubishi GT-PHEV
 Renault Trezor (all-electric car)
 Ssangyong LIV-2
 Volkswagen I.D. (all-electric car)

Motorsport cars
 Citroën C3 WRC (refresh)
 Hyundai i20 Coupe WRC (refresh)
 Toyota Yaris WRC (European Debut)

References

External links

Official web site

Paris Motor Show
Auto shows in France
October 2016 events in France
2016 in Paris